The 1898–99 City Cup was the fifth edition of the City Cup, a cup competition in Irish football.

The tournament was won by Glentoran for the second time.

Group standings

References

1898–99 in Irish association football